Get Weird is the third studio album released by British girl group Little Mix, on 6 November 2015, through Syco Music and Columbia Records. The group began work on a previous album before it was scrapped in 2014, with only a few tracks making it to the final cut. It was supported by four singles including the UK number-one single "Black Magic", "Love Me Like You", "Secret Love Song" featuring American singer Jason Derulo, and "Hair" featuring Jamaican singer Sean Paul. A deluxe edition was later released and features four new tracks, while the Japanese edition of the album features a collaboration with Japanese girl group Flower.

Musically, Get Weird retains the group's previous pop and R&B sound of their debut and sophomore albums while incorporating elements of synth pop, dance pop rock, teen pop, 80s, and 90s sounds. Get Weird was met with generally positive reviews from critics, who described it as their most consistently exciting album to date, with Rolling Stone listing it as one of the best pop albums of 2015. Its subject matters sees Little Mix approach more mature themes with lyrics that addresses a variety of topics including feminism, self love, sexual relationships, breakups, friendships, and independence.

The album debuted and peaked at number two on the UK Albums Chart, breaking the record for the longest-charting girl group album there, spending 97 weeks on the charts. In 2019, it was listed as the eleventh biggest girl group album between 1994 and 2019. It peaked at number one in Ireland, and reached the top ten in New Zealand, Netherlands and Australia. It also reached number thirteen in the States, making Little Mix the first girl group from the UK to have their first three albums debut within the top fifteen of the US Billboard 200. It has since received a triple platinum, three gold, and two platinum music certifications.

Background 
In 2014, Little Mix were in the midst of promoting their second studio album Salute and embarked on their second headlining concert tour, entitled The Salute Tour between May and July, and a North American extension was scheduled for September and October. However, the American tour dates were later cancelled due to the process of recording their next album. In 2021, the group revealed that they had already recorded enough tracks for a full-length album in 2014, but scrapped all but three songs, believing that the quality of the material was not good enough for a release. They put pressure on themselves to make a great third album, but believed that their decision to scrap the original sessions could lead to them getting dropped by their label Syco.

At the 2015 Brit Awards, Little Mix confirmed that their third album was completed, describing it as having a "whole new sound" and projecting the release for sometime in 2015. In May 2015, having written over 100 songs for their third album, they released "Black Magic", the lead single from their third album. They also co-wrote Britney Spears and Iggy Azalea's single "Pretty Girls", which was released in May 2015. The group stated that the album had more of a pop sound than their previous album Salute, an R&B-style album, with the songs being very fun, colourful and personality driven.

On 15 July 2015, the group officially announced on Twitter that their third studio album would be titled Get Weird, and would be available for pre-order the next day. According to Jade Thirlwall, the title was chosen because the girls wanted the album to "bring out the inner weirdness in everyone". Shortly before the album's release, it was revealed that they were forced to change some of the lyrical content on some of their songs, namely "Love Me Like You" and "A.D.I.D.A.S.", both of which contain sexual themes.

Singles
In February 2015, Little Mix revealed that they had chosen the lead single from Get Weird. On 14 May 2015, they announced the song's name was "Black Magic", after the single's cover art surfaced on music identification service Shazam. "Black Magic" was scheduled to premiere on 26 May but was later moved forward to 21 May, after the single leaked online on 20 May. The single was released digitally in the UK on 10 July 2015, and was number 1 on the UK charts for three weeks.

On 25 September 2015, the group released "Love Me Like You" as the second single from the album. An official music video followed. On 5 December 2015, it was announced that "Secret Love Song" would be released as the third single from the album in the UK and Ireland. It was sent to UK radio on 7 December 2015. On 11 April 2016, the group announced that "Hair" would serve as the fourth single from Get Weird, and would feature newly recorded guest vocals from reggae pop recording artist Sean Paul. The single was released on 15 April 2016.

Promotional singles
Get Weird, had three promotional singles in total. Hair was released as the album's first promotional single on 28 August 2015. The song charted at number thirty-five in the UK, and reached the charts in Ireland, Australia, and France. "Weird People" was released as the albums second promotional single on October 16, 2015. It reached number seventy-eight in the UK and reached the charts in Australia. On 30 October 2015, "Grown" was released as the album's third and final promotional single. The song charted at number seventy-two on the UK Singles Chart.

Other songs to make appearances on the charts was "Secret Love Song Pt. II" which has been certified Silver in the UK by the British Phonographic Industry (BPI). "Love Me Or Leave Me" was featured in 2020 as part of the After We Collided soundtrack. It has also been certified Silver in the UK.

Promotion
Little Mix performed "Black Magic" at Capital's Summertime Ball in Wembley Stadium on 6 June 2015. They performed the song on the eighteenth series of wish-granting television show Surprise Surprise. The group performed "Black Magic" at the 2015 Teen Choice Awards on 16 August 2015. They also performed acoustic versions of the single.

Tour 

The Get Weird Tour was officially announced on 17 July 2015 through the band's Twitter. It began on 13 March 2016 in Cardiff, Wales at the Motorpoint Arena and continued throughout the UK, Asia, Australia and Europe, concluding with a rearranged gig in Belfast on 2 July. The UK gigs were extended from 31 March, and the gig in Cologne was moved to the Palladium from the Live Music Hall, both due to demand. On 13 October 2015, it was announced that the tour would also include dates in Australia, making it Little Mix's first headline tour outside of the UK and Ireland. The tour grossed $22.1 million and as of January 2018 was the eighth-highest-grossing tour by a girl group.

Critical reception

Get Weird received generally positive reviews from music critics. At Metacritic, which assigns a normalized rating out of 100 to reviews from mainstream critics, the album received an average score of 66, which indicates "generally favourable reviews", based on 5 reviews. AllMusic described the album as "ear-poppingly catchy" and said, "There's a kinetic energy to many of the tracks on Get Weird that brings to mind the arty '80s dance-pop of bands like Yello crossed with the crisp, bluesy soulfulness of Robert Palmer", and concluded that "ultimately, Little Mix's stylish, decade-blending synergy works, and Get Weird ends up being a lot of fun".

NME noted that "the group's personality and powerhouse vocals light up Get Weird, a hook-filled and witty collection of unapologetic pop. With the exception of a moody trap ballad called 'Lightning', this consistently impressive third album is never as inventive as, say, Girls Aloud in their pomp, but its tune count isn't far behind... It might not be that weird, but by this point, you'd be forgiven for thinking that Little Mix are cooler than you gave them credit for." The Guardian stated that Little Mix "spend much of their third album skipping through the cute corridors of 90s tween pop rather than angling for austere adulthood" which the reviewer found to be initially disappointing, but concluding that "business is largely buoyant". The Independent had mixed feelings, saying "there are lots of little things to like about Little Mix's third album... balanced, of course, by plenty of irritations". Get Weird was ranked number 14 on Rolling Stones list of the 20 Best Pop Albums of 2015, which described the album as Little Mix's "most consistently exciting and delightful album to date".

Year-end lists

Commercial performance
In the United Kingdom, Get Weird was a contender for the number one spot. It later peaked at number two on the UK Albums Chart with sales of 60,053 in its first week; being their highest peaking album before being surpassed by Glory Days (2016). In 2015, it ranked at number eleven for the year's best-selling albums in the UK with sales of 389,000. In August 2016 the album was certified double platinum in the UK for shipping over 600,000 total units, and was the fifteenth-biggest selling album of the year. In January 2018, it became the longest-charting album by a girl group, beating a previous record jointly held by Destiny's Child and the Spice Girls. In the same year it was ranked as the sixth-longest charting girl group album inside the Official Albums Chart Top 40, spending a total of 55 weeks there. In 2019, it was named as the eleventh biggest girl group album between 1994 and 2019 and included on the list of biggest albums by female artists between 2010 and 2019. Get Weird was then listed as the 70th biggest album of the 2010s in the United Kingdom.

The album reached number one in Ireland, becoming the group's first number-one in the country. It reached number two in Australia, and the top ten in Scotland, New Zealand, and Netherlands. It also reached the top twenty in ten other music markets including the United States, where it debuted at number 13 on the Billboard 200, with 21,853 copies sold in its debut week becoming the ninth best selling album of that week. It made Little Mix the only girl group from the UK to have their first three albums debut in the top fifteen of the Billboard 200.

Get Weird charted in a further seven other countries, and has been certified triple platinum in the United Kingdom, platinum in Brazil and Denmark, and gold in Mexico, Australia, Denmark, and Singapore. In 2017, the album had sold over 1.5 million copies worldwide. In 2019, it had surpassed over one billion streams on Spotify.

Track listing

Notes
 signifies an additional producer.
"A.D.I.D.A.S." contains elements from "Hold On, We're Going Home" by Drake.

Charts

Weekly charts

Year-end charts

Decade-end charts

Certifications

Release history

References 

2015 albums
Syco Music albums
Little Mix albums
Albums produced by TMS (production team)